Jason Thomas Wright is an American astronomer. He is a professor in the Department of Astronomy and Astrophysics in the Eberly College of Science at Pennsylvania State University, where he also serves as director of the Penn State Extraterrestrial Intelligence Center. He is known for his research on the search for extraterrestrial intelligence, particularly regarding the search for technosignatures.

References

External links
Wright's Pennsylvania State University website

American astronomers
Living people
Boston University alumni
University of California, Berkeley alumni
Pennsylvania State University faculty
Year of birth missing (living people)